Kelasmadin may refer to:
 Kelasmadin 1
 Kelasmadin 2